Steffi Faasusivaitele Hearthington Carruthers (born 24 May 1993 in Samoa) is a Samoan tennis player.

Carruthers has a WTA singles career-high ranking of 662 achieved on 13 October 2014. She also has a doubles career-high ranking of 556, achieved on 16 November 2015. She has won two ITF titles in doubles.

Playing for Pacific Oceania in Fed Cup, Carruthers has a W/L record of 11–11.

Carruthers is the first Samoan woman to play professional tennis and the first Pacific Oceanian player to win a professional tournament.

ITF finals

Doubles: 3 (2–1)

ITF Junior Finals

Singles Finals (0–1)

Doubles (5–3)

Fed Cup participation

Singles

Doubles

References

External links 
 
 
 

1993 births
Living people
Samoan female tennis players